John Hammill (October 14, 1875 – April 6, 1936) served three terms as the 24th Governor of Iowa from 1925 to 1931.

Biography
Hammill was born in Linden, Wisconsin. He earned a law degree from the University of Iowa College of Law in 1897, and practiced law in Britt, Iowa. After serving as a county attorney from 1902 to 1908, he was elected to the Iowa Senate where he served until 1913. In 1920, he was elected the Lieutenant Governor of Iowa and was re-elected to that position in 1922.

In August 1923, Governor N. E. Kendall was sidelined because of a heart condition, which led to speculation that he would resign before the end of his term, thus leaving Hammill as Iowa's governor.  Although Kendall left the state for an extended stay in Hawaii to recuperate, leaving Hammill as Iowa's acting governor for several months, Kendall did not resign. Kendall did not seek re-election in 1924, and Hammill announced his candidacy for the post.

Hammill won the 1924 Republican gubernatorial nomination, and defeated James C. Murtagh in the general election in a landslide. He was sworn into the governor's office on January 15, 1925. He won reelection to a second term in 1926 (defeating Democratic candidate Alex R. Miller), and to a third term in 1928 (defeating Democratic candidate L. W. Housel).

Hammill advocated for the sterilization of the unfit.

The following changes occurred during his tenure:
an office of superintendent of child welfare was instituted;
banking laws were managed by a state banking board;
junior colleges were initiated into the public school system;
the state's highway system was expanded, updated and put under the management of the state highway commission; and
a constitutional amendment was sanctioned that allowed women to be elected to the General Assembly.

Hammill did not run for reelection as governor in 1930, choosing instead to run for the United States Senate. He lost in the Republican primary to Lester J. Dickinson.

He died on April 6, 1936, of a heart attack in a Minneapolis hotel room and was buried in Britt.

References

External links
, TIME, Aug. 8, 1927.

1875 births
1936 deaths
Iowa lawyers
Republican Party Iowa state senators
Lieutenant Governors of Iowa
Republican Party governors of Iowa
Iowa State University alumni
University of Iowa College of Law alumni
People from Linden, Wisconsin
People from Britt, Iowa
Burials in Iowa
20th-century American politicians